Coccothrinax fragrans is a palm which is native to eastern Cuba and Hispaniola.

Information
Henderson and colleagues (1995) considered C. fragrans to be a synonym of Coccothrinax argentata. It is commonly known as fragrant Cuban thatch palm. Coccothrinax fragrans is best suited to tropical and warm climates that do not get frost, and the palm is adaptable to coastal exposure.

Description
Coccothrinax fragrans has dark green fan leaves with silvery undersides. It is a slow growing and stealthy palm when healthy.

References

fragrans
Trees of Cuba
Trees of Haiti
Trees of the Dominican Republic 
Plants described in 1929
Taxa named by Max Burret